Chotovice is the name of several places in the Czech Republic:
 Chotovice (Česká Lípa District), a village in the Liberec Region
 Chotovice (Svitavy District), a village in the Pardubice Region

Alternatively:
 Choťovice, a village in the Central Bohemian Region